Jesús María is a city in the province of Córdoba, Argentina, located 49 km due north from the provincial capital Córdoba, on National Route 9, within the valley of the Sierras Chicas.

The origin of the city was a ranch (estancia) founded by missionaries of the Society of Jesus in 1618. A convent not far from the city, dating back to the 18th century, is preserved and hosts the National Jesuit Museum. The Jesuit Block and Estancias of Córdoba were named World Heritage Site in 2000.

Jesús María is an agricultural center for the production of maize, lentils, broad beans, peas, chickpeas and saffron.

Annually since 1966, during ten days in January, the city hosts the Festival Nacional de la Doma y el Folclore (Horse Training and Folklore Festival), which gathers around 200,000 national and international attendants. The festival is held in the stadium known as La Doma located close to the downtown core of the city. Among street vendors and side shows, the festival features a celebration of old Gaucho culture.

References

External links
 
 Córdoba Global — Overview of Jesús María.  
  Festival de Doma y Folklore de Jesús María — Official website  
  ArgentinaXplora — Festival de Doma y Folklore de Jesús María.  
 Enjoy Argentina — Historical and touristic information.

Populated places in Córdoba Province, Argentina
Populated places established in 1868
Cities in Argentina
Argentina
Córdoba Province, Argentina